Donald J. Forman (January 17, 1926 – May 10, 2018) was an American collegiate and professional basketball player.

A 5'10" guard from New York University, Forman played one season (1948–49) in the Basketball Association of America as a member of the Minneapolis Lakers.  He averaged 4.1 points per game and won a league championship.

BAA career statistics

Regular season

Playoffs

References

External links
 

1926 births
2018 deaths
All-American college men's basketball players
American men's basketball players
Basketball players from New York City
Boys High School (Brooklyn) alumni
Guards (basketball)
Minneapolis Lakers players
NYU Violets men's basketball players